Part of the Baffin Island offshore islands located in Wayne Bay, west of Becher Peninsula, the Old Squaw Islands are part of the Arctic Archipelago and the Qikiqtaaluk Region, in the Canadian territory of Nunavut.

References

External links 
 Old Squaw Islands in the Atlas of Canada - Toporama; Natural Resources Canada

Archipelagoes of Baffin Island
Uninhabited islands of Qikiqtaaluk Region
Archipelagoes of the Canadian Arctic Archipelago